Uncle Joe may refer to:

People 
 Joseph Stalin (1878–1953), Soviet leader, called "Uncle Joe" by Western media
 Joe Biden (born 1942), current president of the United States, sometimes nicknamed "Uncle Joe" in the press
 Uncle Joe Cannon (1836–1926), Joseph Gurney Cannon, a United States politician
 Joseph E. Johnston (1807–1891), Confederate general during the American Civil War
 Joseph Ligambi (born 1939), American mobster and former boss of the Philadelphia crime family
 Joe McGinness (1914–2003), Australian Aboriginal rights activist
 Joshua Mills (1859–1943), Australian MP
 Joe Vlasits (1921–1985), Hungarian football player and manager

Characters 
Uncle Joe (Petticoat Junction character), Joe Carson, a character from Petticoat Junction and related series
Uncle Joe Shannon, the eponymous character of the movie Uncle Joe Shannon
Joe Biden (The Onion), the portrayal of Joe Biden in the newspaper The Onion, sometimes known as "Uncle Joe"

Other uses 
Uncle Joe (film), a 1941 American film directed by Howard M. Railsback and Raymond E. Swartley
Uncle Joe's Mint Balls, traditional mints produced by Wm Santus & Co

See also
Tío Pepe

Lists of people by nickname